Lee Seung-yong (born 6 September 1970) is a South Korean fencer. He competed in the team foil events at the 1992 Summer Olympics.

References

External links
 

1970 births
Living people
South Korean male foil fencers
Olympic fencers of South Korea
Fencers at the 1992 Summer Olympics